The Nahdlatul Ulama Islamic University (abbreviated UNISNU) is a private university in the city of Jepara, Central Java, Indonesia. The university is located in Tahunan an area of Jepara, Central Java.

UNISNU has five faculties and graduate programs: faculty of economics and business, faculty of tarbiyah and gurus, faculty of da'wah and communication, faculty of sharia and law, faculty of science and technology and graduate programs.

Faculties
The university have five faculties and graduate program:
Faculty of Economics and Business
Faculty of Tarbiyah and Gurus
Faculty of Da'wah and Communication
Faculty of Sharia and Law
Faculty of Science and Technology
Graduate Programs

Reference

Universities in Central Java
Islamic universities and colleges in Indonesia